The Rialto Theater in Casper, Wyoming was built as the New Lyric Theater in 1921. It was constructed with 800 seats by Henry Brennan who had a successful Vaudeville house, on which he based the new cinema. He almost immediately sold the building in 1922 to new owner E.J. Schulte who invested $50,000 in a remodeling project designed by Casper architects William Dubois and Leon Goodrich. The reopening in 1922 featured the William C. deMille movie Nice People, a silent film that was accompanied by the Chicago Netto Ladies Orchestra. In 1928 the Rialto began to show talkies.

The brick facade is plain in form but the brickwork is extensively detailed. A tall neon sign marks the corner, replacing the original metal sign and a marquee was added, covering the original leaded glass transoms over the storefronts. A tall parapet adds to the apparent mass of the theater. Storefronts on both frontages house retail shops. On the interior a balcony is reached by two curving stairs on either side of the lobby, replacing a single grand stair from the first design.

The Rialto continues to operate as a cinema.  It was listed on the National Register of Historic Places in 1993.

References

External links

 at the National Park Service's NRHP database
Rialto Theater at the Wyoming State Historic Preservation Office

Theatres on the National Register of Historic Places in Wyoming
Buildings and structures in Casper, Wyoming
Cinemas and movie theaters in Wyoming
Theatres completed in 1921
Tourist attractions in Casper, Wyoming
National Register of Historic Places in Natrona County, Wyoming